Gottfried Bermann, later Gottfried Bermann Fischer (31 July 1897, Gleiwitz, Silesia – 17 September 1995, Camaiore), was a German publisher. He owned the S. Fischer Verlag.

Biography
After serving as an officer in World War I, Bermann Fischer studied medicine at the universities of Breslau, Freiburg and Munich. In 1924 he met the daughter of the publisher Samuel Fischer, Brigitte, and married her in February 1926.

In 1936 Fischer moved from Berlin to Vienna, and thereafter to Stockholm and to the United States. 
In 1942 in New York he formed the imprint of L.B. Fischer, together with Fritz Landshoff.

Literary works 
 Wanderer durch ein Jahrhundert. Fischer (Tb.), Frankfurt 1994, 
 Bedroht, bewahrt. Fischer (S.), Frankfurt 1981, 
 Briefwechsel mit Autoren. Fischer (S.), Frankfurt 2001, 
 Lebendige Gegenwart. ²1987, 
 Briefwechsel. [with Carl Zuckmayer], Wallstein 2004, 
 Briefwechsel 1932 - 1955. [with Thomas Mann], Fischer (Tb.), Frankfurt 1975, 
 Die neue Rundschau vom 6. Juni 1945. Faksimileausgabe, S. Fischer, Frankfurt 2001,  (Hg.)

References

External links
 
 Nachlass im Marbacher Literaturarchiv

1897 births
1995 deaths
People from the Province of Silesia
People from Gliwice
German publishers (people)
Commanders Crosses of the Order of Merit of the Federal Republic of Germany